Yevhen Falkovskyi (born February 5, 1982) is a Ukrainian footballer who plays with FC Khleborob Nyzhni Torhai in the Ukrainian Football Amateur League.

Career

Ukraine 
Falkovskyi began his career in 2001 with FC Inter Boyarka in the Ukrainian Second League. Throughout his time in the Second League he played with FC Systema-KKhP Cherniakhiv, FC Elektrometalurh-NZF Nikopol, MFC Mykolaiv, FC Zhitichi, FC Enerhiya Yuzhnoukrainsk, and FC Enerhiya Nova Kakhovka. In 2011, he played in the Ukrainian First League with FC Krymteplytsia Molodizhne. He returned to the Ukrainian Second League in 2012 with FC UkrAhroKom Holovkivka, but secured promotion the following season. He later played with FC Myr Hornostayivka, and FC Krystal Kherson.

Canada & Ukraine 
In 2017, he played abroad in the Canadian Soccer League with FC Ukraine United. In his debut season he assisted FC Ukraine in achieving a perfect season, and contributed a goal in winning the Second Division Championship. While in his second year he assisted in securing the First Division title. In 2019, he returned to Ukraine to play in the Ukrainian Football Amateur League with FC Khleborob Nyzhni Torhai.

Honors 
FC UkrAhroKom Holovkivka
 Ukrainian Second League: 2012-2013
FC Ukraine United
 CSL II Championship: 2017
 Canadian Soccer League First Division: 2018

References

External links
 
 

Ukrainian footballers
Living people
1982 births
FC Inter Boyarka players
FC Elektrometalurh-NZF Nikopol players
MFC Mykolaiv players
FC Enerhiya Yuzhnoukrainsk players
FC Enerhiya Nova Kakhovka players
FC Krymteplytsia Molodizhne players
FC UkrAhroKom Holovkivka players
FC Myr Hornostayivka players
FC Krystal Kherson players
FC Ukraine United players
Canadian Soccer League (1998–present) players
Association football forwards
Ukrainian First League players
Ukrainian Second League players